Hopea reticulata is a species of tree in the family Dipterocarpaceae. It is found in Thailand and Vietnam. Some authors include Hopea exalata of Hainan, China to this species.

References

reticulata
Trees of Thailand
Trees of Vietnam
Critically endangered flora of Asia
Taxonomy articles created by Polbot